Larceny is a form of theft.

Larceny may also refer to:

Films
 Larceny, Inc., 1942 film
 Larceny (1948 film), an American film noir crime film
 Larceny (2004 film), a comedy film
 Larceny, 2017 film

Other uses
 Larceny (Scheme implementation), an implementation of the Scheme programming language
 Larceny Act

See also
 Larsen (disambiguation)